Xiangyangjie Subdistrict is a subdistrict and the seat of Jinshi City in Hunan, China. The subdistrict was formed in 1966, in December 2002, Yangyou Township was merged to it. It has 7 communities under its jurisdiction.

External links
 Official Website (Chinese / 中文)

References

Jinshi City
Subdistricts of Hunan
County seats in Hunan